Oxford House may refer to:

 Oxford House, a system of drug rehabilitation shelter/halfway houses
 Oxford House (Grand Forks, North Dakota), listed on the NRHP in North Dakota
 Oxford House, Manitoba, First Nations Cree community in Canada
 Oxford House, Hong Kong, an office tower within the TaiKoo Place complex in Hong Kong
 Oxford House (settlement) in Bethnal Green, London
 Oxford House Research, a consultancy focusing on cultural, ethical, and religious issues.